Charles O'Hagan (28 July 1881 – 1 July 1931) was an Irish professional association football player (an inside left) and manager.

He was the first Aberdeen player to be capped at international level for any team, making an appearance for Ireland in April 1907 (his sixth cap overall at that stage), a year before teammate Willie Lennie made his Scotland debut. He later served with the Leinster Regiment and Highland Light Infantry during the First World War.

O'Hagan was Norwich City's sixth manager, and was in charge for 21 matches between 1920 and 1921; his sides won 4 games, lost 8 and drew 9.

His nephew Willie O'Hagan, a goalkeeper, was also an Irish international.

Career statistics

International

Wales score listed first, score column indicates score after each O'Hagan goal

References

External links

Sevilla CF profile
Charlie O'Hagen (Wild Geese Blog)

Norwich City F.C. managers
Sevilla FC managers
1881 births
1931 deaths
People from Buncrana
Aberdeen F.C. players
Everton F.C. players
Tottenham Hotspur F.C. players
Greenock Morton F.C. players
Third Lanark A.C. players
Middlesbrough F.C. players
Derry Celtic F.C. players
NIFL Premiership players
English Football League players
Southern Football League players
Scottish Football League players
British Army personnel of World War I
Irish soldiers
Prince of Wales's Leinster Regiment soldiers
Highland Light Infantry soldiers
Pre-1950 IFA international footballers
Irish association footballers (before 1923)
Association footballers from County Donegal
Association football inside forwards
Expatriate football managers in Spain
Republic of Ireland expatriate football managers
Irish expatriate sportspeople in Spain
Irish emigrants to the United States
Irish sports journalists